Emma Lu Davis (1905–1988; also spelled Emma Lou Davis) was an American sculptor, painter, and anthropologist.

Biography

Early life and education 

Davis was born in Indianapolis on November 26, 1905. After graduating from Vassar College in 1927, she studied for three years at the Pennsylvania Academy of Fine Arts.

Career 
After leaving school, Davis spent three years as a freelancer working on a variety of commissions. In 1933 she spent six months studying modern techniques and design under Buckminster Fuller at the Dymaxion factory in Bridgeport, Connecticut. At the factory, she wrote later that she learned "the principles of good workmanship. I think there are a great many 'artists' but awfully few real craftsmen. Use of tools and neat, fast, strong construction are not taught much in art schools." It was there that she learned how to work with wood, and began experimenting with abstract forms. Her figurative sculptures from the 1930s reflect her interest in the naive art of various folk cultures; for example, "Grotesque Bull" (shown), a terra cotta sculpture which was included in Dorothy Miller's "Americans 1942" exhibition at MoMA.

In spring 1935 Davis traveled to Russia to learn how Russian artists were organized and how socialized patronage affected their work. She concluded that Soviet artists failed to innovate because "the cheap academic traditions have been continued under the name of 'socialist realism'—that is, all the facts and none of the meaning of the subject."

From 1938 to 1941 Davis was the artist in residence at Reed College in Portland, Oregon. She described this period as "the most profitable and enjoyable three years of my life." In 1939 she was commissioned by the federal Treasury Section of Fine Arts to paint a mural, Missouri Livestock, for the post office in La Plata, Missouri. Two years later she collaborated with Henry Kreis on a series of low-relief granite sculptures depicting the benefits of social security for the overdoor panels of the Wilbur J. Cohen Federal Building in Washington, D.C.

After practicing as a commercial artist for thirty years, Davis decided to retrain as an archaeologist. She completed her Ph.D. at UCLA in 1965, writing a dissertation titled Anasazi Mobility and Mesa Verde Migrations (1964). She worked Science Direction at the San Diego Museum of Man, while continuing her desert studies, focusing on the southern California region of China Lake. Prior to her retirement, she established the Great Basin Foundation, which conducted paleo-environmental research. According to Joseph L. Chartkoff, Davis was "one of the most important figures in bringing scientific rigor and credibility to Paleoindian archaeology in California."

Death and legacy 
Davis died in San Diego on October 19, 1988. Her artwork is included in the collections of the Museum of Modern Art, the Whitney Museum of American Art, and other public and private collections.

Selected exhibitions 
 Solo exhibition at the Peiping Institute of Fine Arts, Beiping, China, 1937
 Boyer Galleries, New York, 1937
 Pennsylvania Academy of Fine Arts, 1938 and 1939
 1939 New York World's Fair
 Americans 1942: 18 Artists from 9 States, Museum of Modern Art, 1942
 Recent Acquisitions: The Work of Young Americans, Museum of Modern Art, 1943
 The Permanent Collection—Women Artists, Whitney Museum of American Art, 1970
 Painting and Sculpture Changes 2011, Museum of Modern Art, 2011

Selected writings

References

Further reading

External links 
 Photo: Emma Lu Davis. Chinese Red Army Soldier. 1936. Walnut. The Museum of Modern Art, New York.
 Photo: Emma Lu Davis. Cock. 1932. Painted wood with copper on wood base. Whitney Museum of American Art.
 Photo: Emma Lu Davis. Family Group. Granite. Department of Health and Human Services, formerly Social Security Building. 1939.
 Photo: Emma Lu Davis. Missouri Livestock. 1939. Post office, La Plata, MO.

1905 births
1988 deaths
20th-century American women artists
American women sculptors
American women painters
American women anthropologists
People from Indianapolis
Vassar College alumni
University of California, Los Angeles alumni
Section of Painting and Sculpture artists